The 1960 United States presidential election in Wyoming took place on November 8, 1960, as part of the 1960 United States presidential election. State voters chose three representatives, or electors, to the Electoral College, who voted for president and vice president.

Wyoming was won by incumbent Vice President Richard Nixon (R–California), running with United States Ambassador to the United Nations Henry Cabot Lodge, Jr., with 55.01 percent of the popular vote, against Senator John F. Kennedy (D–Massachusetts), running with Senator Lyndon B. Johnson, with 44.99% of the popular vote.

Campaign
At the Democratic National Convention the Wyoming delegation had the ceremonial role of giving Kennedy the minimum amount needed to win the Democratic presidential nomination with Teno Roncalio casting the votes although Tracy S. McCraken, Wyoming's national committeeman, was incorrectly stated to have been the one to cast the votes by Time magazine. Governor John J. Hickey stated that the issue over Kennedy's Catholicism would not be important in Wyoming due to Hickey, who was also a Catholic, having won in 1958. During the campaign Nixon conducted a fifty-state strategy and visited every state at least once including Wyoming.

The Republican Party selected Harry B. Henderson, Mary Ellen Hinrichs, and James B. Griffith Sr. as their presidential electors.

Results

Results by county

Endorsements

See also
 United States presidential elections in Wyoming

References

Wyoming
1960
1960 Wyoming elections